Iron Bridge may refer to:

Bridges 
 The Iron Bridge, Shropshire, England; the first major bridge in the world to be made of cast iron
 The Iron Bridge, Rothiemurchus, Scotland, also known as the Cairngorm Club Footbridge
 The Iron Bridge, Culford Park, in Suffolk, England
 Iron Bridge, Riga, in Latvia
 Iron Bridge, Satu Mare, in Romania
 Aldford Iron Bridge in Aldford, Cheshire, England
 Nandu River Iron Bridge in Hainan, China
 Ponte dell'Industria in Rome, Italy, also known as Ponte di ferro
 Traffic Bridge (Saskatoon) in Saskatchewan, Canada

Places 
 Ironbridge, a settlement in Shropshire, England
 Ironbridge Gorge, the gorge formed by the River Severn in Shropshire, England
 Iron Bridge, Ontario, Canada, a community in Huron Shores

Other uses 
 Iron Bridge, original codename for the planning of the funeral of Margaret Thatcher
 Battle of the Iron Bridge, fought in 637 near Antioch, Turkey